Laurence-Anne Charest Gagné is a Canadian pop singer from Quebec, whose debut album Première apparition was a longlisted nominee for the 2019 Polaris Music Prize.

Originally from Saint-Pascal in the Kamouraska RCM of Quebec, Gagné was a finalist in the 2017 edition of the Francouvertes music competition. Première apparition was released independently in February 2019; and Laurence-Anne supported the album with a summer tour of Quebec. In addition to her Polaris nomination, she received a SOCAN Songwriting Prize nomination in 2020 for the song "Instant zéro".

She subsequently signed to Bonsound, which released her follow-up EP Accident in August 2020.

Discography 
2019 - Première Apparition (Duprince)
2020 - Accident (Ep) (Bonsound)
2021 - Musivision (Bonsound)

References

Canadian women pop singers
French-language singers of Canada
French Quebecers
Singers from Quebec
People from Bas-Saint-Laurent
Living people
Year of birth missing (living people)